William Wallace Duncan (December 20, 1839 – March 2, 1908) was an American bishop of the Methodist Episcopal Church, South, elected in 1886.

Biography
William Wallace Duncan was born December 20, 1839, in Boydton, Virginia, of Scots-Irish descent and of scholarship. He was the son of Professor David Duncan, a native of Ireland, and of University of Edinburgh in Scotland. He settled in Kentucky, then migrated to Virginia.

William graduated from Wofford College in South Carolina in 1858 and joined the Virginia Annual Conference of the M.E. Church, South in 1859. He was a chaplain of the Army of the Confederate States of America during the American Civil War. Rev. Duncan transferred to the South Carolina Conference in 1875. He was a delegate to the First and Second Ecumenical Methodist Conferences, in 1881 and 1891, respectively. Prior to his election to the episcopacy, he served as a pastor and an educator.

Bishop Duncan died March 2, 1908, in Spartanburg, South Carolina, where he is also buried.

Bibliography
J. C. Kilgo, An Appreciation, 1908.

See also
List of bishops of the United Methodist Church

References

"Sketch" by Bishop Fitzgerald in Fitzgerald, O.P. and Galloway C.B., Eminent Methodists, 1897
Leete, Frederick DeLand, Methodist Bishops, Nashville, The Parthenon Press, 1948

1839 births
1908 deaths
American biographers
American male biographers
American Methodist bishops
Bishops of the Methodist Episcopal Church, South
Confederate States Army chaplains
Wofford College alumni
People from Boydton, Virginia
People from Spartanburg, South Carolina
Burials in South Carolina
Methodist chaplains
19th-century American clergy